Schwarzenberg may refer to:

People 
 House of Schwarzenberg, Franconian and Bohemian aristocratic family which was first mentioned in 1172
 Karl Philipp, Prince of Schwarzenberg (1771–1820), Field Marshal in Austrian service during the Napoleonic Wars
 Prince Felix of Schwarzenberg (1800–1852), Austrian statesman
 Adolph Schwarzenberg (1890–1950)
 Karel Schwarzenberg, (born 1937), former Minister of Foreign Affairs of the Czech Republic (2007–2009), candidate in presidential election in 2013

Places

In Austria 
 Schwarzenberg, Austria, a village in Bregenzerwald in Vorarlberg
 Schwarzenberg am Böhmerwald, Upper Austria

In Germany 
 Schwarzenberg, Saxony, a town in Saxony
 Aue-Schwarzenberg, a district in Saxony
 Schwarzenberg (Schömberg), a part of Schömberg im Schwarzwald, Baden-Württemberg
 A part of Baiersbronn, in the Black Forest
 Barony of Schwarzenberg, a domain around Schwarzenberg/Erzgeb. in Saxony

In Switzerland 
 Schwarzenberg, Switzerland, in the Canton of Lucerne
 A part of Le Noirmont in the Canton of Jura

Castles and palaces 
 Schwarzenberg Castle (Saxony) in Schwarzenberg, Saxony
 Schwarzenberg Castle (Bavaria) in Scheinfeld, Bavaria
 Palais Schwarzenberg in Vienna, Austria
 Palais Schwarzenberg, former residence of the House of Schwarzenberg in Prague, Czech Republic

Mountains 
 Schwarzenberg (Breidenbacher Grund), Hesse, Germany
 A mountain that is part of Langenberg, a mountain in the Rhön Mountains
 A mountain with the elevation of 413 m in Westlausitzer Bergland, see Elstra

Other 
 The Free Republic of Schwarzenberg, a short-lived de facto independent country after the German capitulation
 Schwarzenberg, a 1984 novel about the Free Republic, by Stefan Heym

See also 
 Schwarzenberger
 Schwarzenburg, a municipality in the district of Bern-Mittelland in the canton of Bern in Switzerland
 Schwarzburg, a municipality in Thuringia, Germany